The Book of Mormon is a religious text of the Latter Day Saint movement, which, according to Latter Day Saint theology, contains writings of ancient prophets who lived on the American continent from 600 BC to AD 421 and during an interlude dated by the text to the unspecified time of the Tower of Babel. It was first published in March 1830 by Joseph Smith as The Book of Mormon: An Account Written by the Hand of Mormon upon Plates Taken from the Plates of Nephi. The Book of Mormon is one of four standard works of the Latter Day Saint movement and one of the movement's earliest unique writings. The denominations of the Latter Day Saint movement typically regard the text primarily as scripture and secondarily as a record of God's dealings with ancient inhabitants of the Americas. The majority of Latter Day Saints believe the book to be a record of real-world history, with Latter Day Saint denominations viewing it variously as an inspired record of scripture to the lynchpin or "keystone" of their religion. Some Latter Day Saint academics and apologetic organizations strive to affirm the book as historically authentic through their scholarship and research, but mainstream archaeological, historical, and scientific communities have discovered little to support the existence of the civilizations described therein, and do not consider it to be an actual record of historical events.

According to Smith's account and the book's narrative, the Book of Mormon was originally written in otherwise unknown characters referred to as "reformed Egyptian" engraved on golden plates. Smith said that the last prophet to contribute to the book, a man named Moroni, buried it in the Hill Cumorah in present-day Manchester, New York, before his death, and then appeared in a vision to Smith in 1827 as an angel, revealing the location of the plates and instructing him to translate the plates into English. Most naturalistic views on the origins of the Book of Mormon hold that Smith authored it, drawing, whether consciously or subconsciously, on material and ideas from his contemporary 19th-century environment, rather than translating an ancient record.

The Book of Mormon has a number of doctrinal discussions on subjects such as the fall of Adam and Eve, the nature of the Christian atonement, eschatology, agency, priesthood authority, redemption from physical and spiritual death, the nature and conduct of baptism, the age of accountability, the purpose and practice of communion, personalized revelation, economic justice, the anthropomorphic and personal nature of God, the nature of spirits and angels, and the organization of the latter day church. The pivotal event of the book is an appearance of Jesus Christ in the Americas shortly after his resurrection. Common teachings of the Latter Day Saint movement hold that the Book of Mormon fulfills numerous biblical prophecies by ending a global apostasy and signaling a restoration of Christian gospel. The book is also a critique of Western society, condemning immorality, individualism, social inequality, ethnic injustice, nationalism, and the rejection of God, revelation, and miraculous religion.

The Book of Mormon is divided into smaller books, titled after individuals named as primary authors or other caretakers of the ancient record the Book of Mormon describes itself as and, in most versions, is divided into chapters and verses. Its English text imitates the style of the King James Version of the Bible, and its grammar and word choice reflect Early Modern English. The Book of Mormon has been fully or partially translated into at least 112 languages.

Origin

Conceptual emergence 
According to Joseph Smith, in 1823, when he was seventeen years old, an angel of God named Moroni appeared to him and said that a collection of ancient writings was buried in a nearby hill in present-day Wayne County, New York, engraved on golden plates by ancient prophets. The writings were said to describe a people whom God had led from Jerusalem to the Western hemisphere 600 years before Jesus's birth. (This "angel Moroni" figure also appears in the Book of Mormon as the last prophet among these people and had buried the record, which God had promised to bring forth in the latter days.) Smith said this vision occurred on the evening of September 21, 1823, and that on the following day, via divine guidance, he located the burial location of the plates on this hill and was instructed by Moroni to meet him at the same hill on September 22 of the following year to receive further instructions, which repeated annually for the next three years. Smith told his entire immediate family about this angelic encounter by the next night, and his brother William reported that the family "believed all he [Joseph Smith] said" about the angel and plates.

Smith and his family reminisced that as part of what Smith believed was angelic instruction, Moroni provided Smith with a "brief sketch" of the "origin, progress, civilization, laws, governments... righteousness and iniquity" of the "aboriginal inhabitants of the country" (referring to the Nephites and Lamanites who figure in the Book of Mormon's primary narrative). Smith sometimes shared what he believed he had learned through such angelic encounters with his family in what his mother Lucy Mack Smith called "most amusing recitals".

In Smith's account, Moroni allowed him, accompanied by his wife Emma Hale Smith, to take the plates on September 22, 1827, four years after his initial visit to the hill, and directed him to translate them into English. Smith said the angel Moroni strictly instructed him to not let anyone else see the plates without divine permission. Neighbors, some of whom had collaborated with Smith in earlier treasure-hunting enterprises, several times tried to steal the plates from Smith while he and his family guarded them.

Dictation 
As Smith and contemporaries reported, the English manuscript of the Book of Mormon was produced as scribes wrote down Smith's dictation in multiple sessions between 1828 and 1829. The dictation of the extant Book of Mormon was completed in 1829 in between 53 and 74 working days.

Descriptions of the way in which Smith dictated the Book of Mormon vary. Smith himself called the Book of Mormon a translated work, but in public he generally described the process itself only in vague terms, saying he translated by a miraculous gift from God. According to some accounts from his family and friends at the time, early on, Smith copied characters off the plates as part of a process of learning to translate an initial corpus. For the majority of the process, Smith dictated the text by voicing strings of words which a scribe would write down; after the scribe confirmed they had finished writing, Smith would continue.

Many accounts describe Smith dictating by reading a text as it appeared either on seer stones he already possessed or on a set of spectacles that accompanied the plates, prepared by the Lord for the purpose of translating. The spectacles, often called the "Nephite interpreters," or the "Urim and Thummim," after the Biblical divination stones, were described as two clear seer stones which Smith said he could look through in order to translate, bound together by a metal rim and attached to a breastplate. Beginning around 1832, both the interpreters and Smith's own seer stone were at times referred to as the "Urim and Thummim", and Smith sometimes used the term interchangeably with "spectacles". Emma Smith's and David Whitmer's accounts describe Smith using the interpreters while dictating for Martin Harris's scribing and switching to only using his seer stone(s) in subsequent translation. Grant Hardy summarizes Smith's known dictation process as follows: "Smith looked at a seer stone placed in his hat and then dictated the text of the Book of Mormon to scribes". Early on, Smith sometimes separated himself from his scribe with a blanket between them, as he did while Martin Harris, a neighbor, scribed his dictation in 1828. At other points in the process, such as when Oliver Cowdery or Emma Smith scribed, the plates were left covered up but in the open. During some dictation sessions the plates were entirely absent.In 1828, while scribing for Smith, Harris, at the prompting of his wife Lucy Harris, repeatedly asked Smith to loan him the manuscript pages of the dictation thus far. Smith reluctantly acceded to Harris's requests. Within weeks, Harris lost the manuscript, most likely stolen by a member of his extended family. After the loss, Smith recorded that he lost the ability to translate and that Moroni had taken back the plates to be returned only after Smith repented. Smith later stated that God allowed him to resume translation, but directed that he begin where he left off (in what is now called the Book of Mosiah), without retranslating what had been in the lost manuscript.

Smith recommenced some Book of Mormon dictation between September 1828 and April 1829 with his wife Emma Smith scribing with occasional help from his brother Samuel Smith, though transcription accomplished was limited. In April 1829, Oliver Cowdery met Smith and, believing Smith's account of the plates, began scribing for Smith in what became a "burst of rapid-fire translation". In May, Joseph and Emma Smith along with Cowdery moved in with the Whitmer family, sympathetic neighbors, in an effort to avoid interruptions as they proceeded with producing the manuscript.

While living with the Whitmers, Smith said he received permission to allow eleven specific others to see the uncovered golden plates and, in some cases, handle them. Their written testimonies are known as the Testimony of Three Witnesses, who described seeing the plates in a visionary encounter with an angel, and the Testimony of Eight Witnesses, who described handling the plates as displayed by Smith. Statements signed by them have been published in most editions of the Book of Mormon. In addition to Smith and these eleven, several others described encountering the plates by holding or moving them wrapped in cloth, although without seeing the plates themselves. Their accounts of the plates' appearance tend to describe a golden-colored compilation of thin metal sheets (the "plates") bound together by wires in the shape of a book.

The manuscript was completed in June 1829. E. B. Grandin published the Book of Mormon in Palmyra, New York, and it went on sale in his bookstore on March 26, 1830. Smith said he returned the plates to Moroni upon the publication of the book.

Views on composition 
No single theory has consistently dominated naturalistic views on Book of Mormon composition. In the twenty-first century, leading naturalistic interpretations of Book of Mormon origins hold that Smith authored it himself, whether consciously or subconsciously, and simultaneously sincerely believed the Book of Mormon was an authentic sacred history.

Most adherents of the Latter Day Saint movement consider the Book of Mormon an authentic historical record, translated by Smith from actual ancient plates through divine revelation. The Church of Jesus Christ of Latter-day Saints (LDS Church), the largest Latter Day Saint denomination, maintains this as its official position.

Methods 
The Book of Mormon as a written text is the transcription of what scholars Grant Hardy and William L. Davis call an "extended oral performance", one which Davis considers "comparable in length and magnitude to the classic oral epics, such as Homer’s Iliad and Odyssey". Eyewitnesses said Smith never referred to notes or other documents while dictating, and Smith's followers and those close to him insisted he lacked the writing and narrative skills necessary to consciously produce a text like the Book of Mormon. Some naturalistic interpretations have therefore compared Smith's dictation to automatic writing arising from the subconscious. However, Ann Taves considers this description problematic for overemphasizing "lack of control" when historical and comparative study instead suggests Smith "had a highly focused awareness" and "a considerable degree of control over the experience" of dictation.

Independent scholar William L. Davis posits that after believing he had encountered an angel in 1823, Smith "carefully developed his ideas about the narratives" of the Book of Mormon for several years by making outlines, whether mental or on private notes, until he began dictating in 1828. Smith's oral recitations about Nephites to his family could have been an opportunity to work out ideas and practice oratory, and he received some formal education as a lay Methodist exhorter. In this interpretation, Smith believed the dictation he produced reflected an ancient history, but he assembled the narrative in his own words.

Inspirations 
Early observers, presuming Smith incapable of writing something as long or as complex as the Book of Mormon, often searched for a possible source he might have plagiarized. In the nineteenth century, a popular hypothesis was that Smith collaborated with Sidney Rigdon (a convert to the early movement whom Smith did not actually meet until after the Book of Mormon was published) to plagiarize an unpublished manuscript written by Solomon Spalding and turn into the Book of Mormon. Historians have considered the Spalding manuscript source hypothesis debunked since 1945, when Fawn M. Brodie thoroughly disproved it in her critical biography of Smith.

Historians since the early-twentieth century have suggested Smith was inspired by View of the Hebrews, an 1823 book which propounded the Hebraic Indian theory, since both associate American Indians with ancient Israel and describe clashes between two dualistically opposed civilizations (View as speculation about American Indian history and the Book of Mormon as its narrative). Whether or not View influenced the Book of Mormon is the subject of debate. A pseudo-anthropological treatise, View presented allegedly empirical evidence in support of its hypothesis. The Book of Mormon is written as a narrative, and Christian themes predominate rather than supposedly indigenous parallels. Additionally, while View supposes that indigenous American peoples descended from the Ten Lost Tribes, the Book of Mormon actively rejects the hypothesis; the peoples in its narrative have an "ancient Hebrew" origin but do not descend from the lost tribes, and the perceived mystery of which the book preserves and escalates. The book ultimately heavily revises, rather than borrows, the Hebraic Indian theory.

The Book of Mormon may creatively reconfigure, without plagiarizing, parts of the popular 1678 Christian allegory Pilgrim's Progress written by John Bunyan. For example, the martyr narrative of Abinadi in the Book of Mormon shares a complex matrix of descriptive language with Faithful's martyr narrative in Progress. Some other Book of Mormon narratives, such as the dream Lehi has in the book's opening, also resemble creative reworkings of Progress story arcs as well as elements of other works by Bunyan, such as The Holy War and Grace Abounding.

Historical scholarship also suggests it's plausible for Smith to have produced the Book of Mormon himself, based on his knowledge of the Bible and enabled by a democratizing religious culture.

Content

Presentation
The English text of the Book of Mormon resembles the style of the King James Version of the Bible, though its rendering can sometimes be repetitive and difficult to read. Nevertheless, narratively and structurally the book is complex and carefully crafted with multiple arcs that diverge and converge in the story while contributing to the book's overarching plot and themes. Historian Daniel Walker Howe concluded in his own appraisal that the Book of Mormon "is a powerful epic written on a grand scale" and "should rank among the great achievements of American literature".

The Book of Mormon presents its text through multiple narrators explicitly identified as figures within the book's own narrative. Narrators describe reading, redacting, writing, and exchanging records. The book also embeds sermons, given by figures from the narrative, throughout the text, and these internal orations make up just over 40 percent of the Book of Mormon. Periodically, the book's primary narrators reflexively describe themselves creating the book in a move that is "almost postmodern" in its self-consciousness. In an essay written to introduce the Book of Mormon, historian Laurie Maffly-Kipp explains that "the mechanics of editing and transmitting thereby become an important feature of the text".

Organization
The Book of Mormon is organized as a compilation of smaller books, each named after its main named narrator or a prominent leader, beginning with the First Book of Nephi (1 Nephi) and ending with the Book of Moroni.

The book's sequence is primarily chronological based on the narrative content of the book. Exceptions include the Words of Mormon and the Book of Ether. The Words of Mormon contains editorial commentary by Mormon. The Book of Ether is presented as the narrative of an earlier group of people who had come to the American continent before the immigration described in 1 Nephi. First Nephi through Omni are written in first-person narrative, as are Mormon and Moroni. The remainder of the Book of Mormon is written in third-person historical narrative, said to be compiled and abridged by Mormon (with Moroni abridging the Book of Ether and writing the latter part of Mormon and the Book of Moroni).

Most modern editions of the book have been divided into chapters and verses. Most editions of the book also contain supplementary material, including the "Testimony of Three Witnesses" and the "Testimony of Eight Witnesses" which appeared in the original 1830 edition and every official Latter-day Saint edition thereafter.

Narrative

The books from First Nephi to Omni are described as being from "the small plates of Nephi". This account begins in ancient Jerusalem around 600 BC, telling the story of a man named Lehi, his family, and several others as they are led by God from Jerusalem shortly before the fall of that city to the Babylonians. The book describes their journey across the Arabian peninsula, and then to a "promised land", presumably an unspecified location in the Americas, by ship. These books recount the group's dealings from approximately 600 BC to about 130 BC, during which time the community grows and splits into two main groups, called Nephites and Lamanites, that frequently war with each other throughout the rest of the narrative.

Following this section is the Words of Mormon, a small book that introduces Mormon, the principal narrator for the remainder of the text. The narration describes the proceeding content (Book of Mosiah through to chapter 7 of the internal Book of Mormon) as being Mormon's abridgment of "the large plates of Nephi", existing records that detailed the people's history up to Mormon's own life. Part of this portion is the Book of Third Nephi, which describes a visit by Jesus to the people of the Book of Mormon sometime after his resurrection and ascension; historian John Turner calls this episode "the climax of the entire scripture". After this visit, the Nephites and Lamanites unite in a harmonious, peaceful society which endures for several generations before breaking into warring factions again, and in this conflict the Nephites are destroyed while the Lamanites emerge victorious. In the narrative, Mormon, a Nephite, lives during this period of war, and he dies before finishing his book. His son Moroni takes over as narrator, describing himself taking his father's record into his charge and finishing its writing.

Before the very end of the book, Moroni describes making an abridgment (called the Book of Ether) of a record from a much earlier people. There is a subsequent subplot describing a group of families who God leads away from the Tower of Babel after it falls. Led by a man named Jared and his brother, described as a prophet of God, these Jaredites travel to the "promised land" and establish a society there. After successive violent reversals between rival monarchs and faction, their society collapses before Lehi's family arrive in the promised land.

The narrative returns to Moroni's present (Book of Moroni) in which he transcribes a few short documents, meditates on and addresses the book's audience, finishes the record, and buries the plates upon which they are narrated to be inscribed upon, before implicitly dying as his father did, in what allegedly would have been the early-400s CE.

Teachings

Jesus

On its title page, the Book of Mormon describes its central purpose as being the "convincing of the Jew and Gentile that Jesus is the Christ, the Eternal God, manifesting himself unto all nations." Jesus is mentioned every 1.7 verses on average.

Although much of the Book of Mormon's internal chronology takes place prior to the birth of Jesus, prophets in the book frequently see him in vision and preach about him, and the people in the narrative worship Jesus as "pre-Christian Christians." For example, the book's first narrator Nephi describes having a vision of the birth, ministry, and death of Jesus, said to have taken place nearly 600 years prior to Jesus' birth. Late in the book, a narrator refers to converted peoples as "children of Christ". By depicting ancient prophets and peoples as familiar with Jesus as a Savior, the Book of Mormon universalizes Christian salvation as being accessible across all time and places. By implying that even more ancient peoples were familiar with Jesus Christ, the book also presents a "polygenist Christian history" in which Christianity has multiple origins.

In what is often called the climax of the book, Jesus visits some early inhabitants of the Americas after his resurrection in an extended bodily theophany. During this ministry, he reiterates many teachings from the New Testament, re-emphasizes salvific baptism, and introduces the ritual consumption of bread and water "in remembrance of [his] body", a teaching that became the basis for modern Latter-day Saints' "memorialist" view of their sacrament ordinance (analogous to communion). Jesus's ministry in the Book of Mormon resembles his portrayal in the Gospel of John, as Jesus similarly teaches without parables and preaches faith and obedience as a central message.

The Book of Mormon depicts Jesus with "a twist" on Christian trinitarianism. Jesus in the Book of Mormon is distinct from God the Father, much as he is in the New Testament, as he prays to God while during a post-resurrection visit with the Nephites. However, the Book of Mormon also emphasizes Jesus and God have "divine unity," and other parts of the book call Jesus "the Father and the Son" or describe the Father, the Son, and the Holy Ghost as "one." As a result, beliefs among the churches of the Latter Day Saint movement range between social trinitarianism (such as among Latter-day Saints) and traditional trinitarianism (such as in Community of Christ).

Distinctively, the Book of Mormon describes Jesus as having, prior to his birth, a spiritual "body" "without flesh and blood" that looked similar to how he would appear during his physical life. According to the book, the Brother of Jared lived before Jesus and saw him manifest in this spiritual "body" thousands of years prior to his birth.

Plan of salvation 

The Christian concept of God's plan of salvation for humanity is a frequently recurring theme of the Book of Mormon. While the Bible does not directly outline a plan of salvation, the Book of Mormon explicitly refers to the concept thirty times, using a variety of terms such as plan of salvation, plan of happiness, and plan of redemption. The Book of Mormon's plan of salvation doctrine describes life as a probationary time for people to learn the gospel of Christ through revelation given to prophets and have the opportunity to choose whether or not to obey God. Jesus' atonement then makes repentance possible, enabling the righteous to enter a heavenly state after a final judgment.

Although most of Christianity traditionally considers the fall of man a negative development for humanity, the Book of Mormon instead portrays the fall as a foreordained step in God's plan of salvation, necessary to securing human agency, eventual righteousness, and bodily joy through physical experience. This positive interpretation of the Adam and Eve story contributes to the Book of Mormon's emphasis "on the importance of human freedom and responsibility" to choose salvation.

Dialogic revelation 

In the Book of Mormon, revelation from God typically manifests as "personalized, dialogic exchange" between God and persons, "rooted in a radically anthropomorphic theology" that personifies deity as a being who hears prayers and provides direct answers to questions. Multiple narratives in the book portray revelation as a dialogue in which petitioners and deity engage one another in a mutual exchange in which God's contributions originate from outside the mortal recipient. The Book of Mormon also emphasizes regular prayer as a significant component of devotional life, depicting it as a central means through which such dialogic revelation can take place.

Distinctively, the Book of Mormon's portrayal democratizes revelation by extending it beyond the "Old Testament paradigms" of prophetic authority. In the Book of Mormon, dialogic revelation from God is not the purview of prophets alone but is instead the right of every person. Figures such as Nephi and Ammon receive visions and revelatory direction prior to or without ever becoming prophets, and Laman and Lemuel are rebuked for hesitating to pray for revelation. In the Book of Mormon, God and the divine are directly knowable through revelation and spiritual experience.

Also in contrast with traditional Christian conceptions of revelations is the Book of Mormon's broader range of revelatory content. In the Book of Mormon, revelatory topics include not only the expected "exegesis of existence" but also questions that are "pragmatic, and at times almost banal in their mundane specificity". Figures petition God for revelatory answers to doctrinal questions and ecclesiastical crises as well as for inspiration to guide hunts, military campaigns, and sociopolitical decisions, and the Book of Mormon portrays God providing answers to these inquiries.

The Book of Mormon depicts revelation as an active and sometimes laborious experience. For example, the Book of Mormon's Brother of Jared learns to act not merely as a petitioner with questions but moreover as an interlocutor with "a specific proposal" for God to consider as part of a guided process of miraculous assistance. Also in the Book of Mormon, Enos describes his revelatory experience as a "wrestle which I had before God" that spanned hours of intense prayer.

Apocalyptic reversal and indigenous or nonwhite liberation 
The Book of Mormon's "eschatological content" lends to a "theology of Native and/or nonwhite liberation", in the words of American studies scholar Jared Hickman. The Book of Mormon's narrative content includes prophecies describing how although Gentiles (generally interpreted as being whites of European descent) would conquer the indigenous residents of the Americas (imagined in the Book of Mormon as being a remnant of descendants of the Lamanites), this conquest would only precede the Native Americans' revival and resurgence as a God-empowered people. The Book of Mormon narrative's prophecies envision a Christian eschaton in which indigenous people are destined to rise up as the true leaders of the continent, manifesting in a new utopia to be called "Zion". White Gentiles would have an opportunity to repent of their sins and join themselves to the indigenous remnant, but if white Gentile society fails to do so, the Book of Mormon's content foretells a future "apocalyptic reversal" in which Native Americans will destroy white American society and replace it with a godly, Zionic society. This prophecy commanding whites to repent and become supporters of American Indians even bears "special authority as an utterance of Jesus" Christ himself during a messianic appearance at the book's climax.

Furthermore, the Book of Mormon's "formal logic" criticizes the theological supports for racism and white supremacy prevalent in the antebellum United States by enacting a textual apocalypse. The book's apparently white Nephite narrators fail to recognize and repent of their own sinful, hubristic prejudices against the seemingly darker-skinned Lamanites in the narrative. In their pride, the Nephites repeatedly backslide into producing oppressive social orders, such that the book's narrative performs a sustained critique of colonialist racism. The book concludes with its own narrative implosion in which Lamanites suddenly succeed over and destroy Nephites in a literary turn seemingly designed to jar the average antebellum white American reader into recognizing the "utter inadequacy of his or her rac(ial)ist common sense".

Religious significance

Early Mormonism 

Adherents of the early Latter Day Saint movement frequently read the Book of Mormon as a corroboration of and supplement to the Bible, persuaded by its resemblance to the King James Version's form and language. For these early readers, the Book of Mormon confirmed the Bible's scriptural veracity and resolved then-contemporary theological controversies the Bible did not seem to adequately address, such as the appropriate mode of baptism, the role of prayer, and the nature of the Christian atonement. Early church administrative design also drew inspiration from the Book of Mormon. Oliver Cowdery and Joseph Smith, respectively, used the depiction of the Christian church in the Book of Mormon as a template for their Articles of the Church and Articles and Covenants of the Church.

The Book of Mormon was also significant in the early movement as a sign, proving Joseph Smith's claimed prophetic calling, signalling the "restoration of all things", and ending what was believed to have been an apostasy from true Christianity . Early Latter Day Saints additionally tended to interpret the Book of Mormon through a millenarian lens and consequently believed the book portended Christ's imminent Second Coming.  And during the movement's first years, observers identified converts with the new scripture they propounded, nicknaming them "Mormons".

Early Mormons also cultivated their own individual relationships with the Book of Mormon. Reading the book became an ordinary habit for some, and some would reference passages by page number in correspondence with friends and family. Historian Janiece Johnson explains that early converts' "depth of Book of Mormon usage is illustrated most thoroughly through intertextuality—the pervasive echoes, allusions, and expansions on the Book of Mormon text that appear in the early converts' own writings." Early Latter Day Saints alluded to Book of Mormon narratives, incorporated Book of Mormon turns of phrase into their writing styles, and even gave their children Book of Mormon names.

Joseph Smith 
Like many other early adherents of the Latter Day Saint movement, Smith referenced Book of Mormon scriptures in his preaching relatively infrequently and cited the Bible more often, likely because he was more familiar with the Bible, which he had grown up with. In 1832, Smith dictated a revelation that condemned the "whole church" for treating the Book of Mormon lightly, although even after doing so Smith still referenced the Book of Mormon less often than the Bible. Nevertheless, in 1841 Joseph Smith characterized the Book of Mormon as "the most correct of any book on earth, and the keystone of [the] religion". Although Smith quoted the book infrequently, he accepted the Book of Mormon narrative world as his own and conceived of his prophetic identity within the framework of the Book of Mormon's portrayal of a world history full of sacred records of God's dealings with humanity and description of him as a revelatory translator.

While they were held in Carthage Jail together, shortly before being killed in a mob attack, Joseph's brother Hyrum Smith read aloud from the Book of Mormon, and Joseph told the jail guards present that the Book of Mormon was divinely authentic.

The Church of Jesus Christ of Latter-day Saints 
The Church of Jesus Christ of Latter-day Saints (LDS Church) accepts the Book of Mormon as one of the four sacred texts in its scriptural canon called the standard works. Church leaders and publications have "strongly affirm[ed]" Smith's claims of the book's significance to the faith. According to the church's "Articles of Faith"—a document written by Joseph Smith in 1842 and canonized by the church as scripture in 1880—members "believe the Bible to be the word of God as far as it is translated correctly," and they "believe the Book of Mormon to be the word of God," without the translation qualification. In their evangelism, Latter-day Saint leaders and missionaries have long emphasized the book's place in a causal chain which held that if the Book of Mormon was "verifiably true revelation of God," then it justified Smith's claims to prophetic authority to restore the New Testament church.

Latter-day Saints have also long believed the Book of Mormon's contents confirm and fulfill biblical prophecies. For example, "many Latter-day Saints" consider the biblical patriarch Jacob's description of his son Joseph as "a fruitful bough... whose branches run over a wall" a prophecy of Lehi's posterity—described as descendants of Joseph—overflowing into the New World. Latter-day Saints also believe the Bible prophesies of the Book of Mormon as an additional testament to God's dealings with humanity, such as in their interpretation of Ezekiel 37's injunction to "take thee one stick... For Judah, and... take another stick... For Joseph" as referring to the Bible as the "stick of Judah" and the Book of Mormon as "the stick of Joseph".

In the 1980s, the church placed greater emphasis on the Book of Mormon as a central text of the faith and on studying and reading it as a means for devotional communion with Jesus Christ. In 1982, it added the subtitle "Another Testament of Jesus Christ" to its official editions of the Book of Mormon. Ezra Taft Benson, the church's thirteenth president (1985–1994), especially emphasized the Book of Mormon. Referencing Smith's 1832 revelation, Benson said the church remained under condemnation for treating the Book of Mormon lightly.

Since the late 1980s, Latter-day Saint leaders have encouraged church members to read from the Book of Mormon daily, and in the twenty-first century, many Latter-day Saints use the book in private devotions and family worship. Literary scholar Terryl Givens observes that for Latter-day Saints, the Book of Mormon is "the principal scriptural focus", a "cultural touchstone, and "absolutely central" to worship, including in weekly services, Sunday School, youth seminaries, and more.

The church encourages those considering joining the faith to follow the suggestion in the Book of Mormon's final chapter to study the book, ponder it, and pray to God about it. Latter-day Saints believe that sincerely doing so will provide the reader with a spiritual witness confirming it as true scripture. The relevant passage in the chapter is sometimes referred to as "Moroni's Promise."

Approximately 90 to 95% of all Book of Mormon printings have been affiliated with the church. As of October 2020, it has published more than 192 million copies of the Book of Mormon.

Community of Christ
The Community of Christ (formerly the Reorganized Church of Jesus Christ of Latter Day Saints or RLDS Church) views the Book of Mormon as scripture which provides an additional witness of Jesus Christ in support of the Bible. The Community of Christ publishes two versions of the book. The first is the Authorized Edition, first published by the then-RLDS Church in 1908, whose text is based on comparing the original printer's manuscript and the 1837 Second Edition (or "Kirtland Edition") of the Book of Mormon. Its content is similar to the Latter-day Saint edition of the Book of Mormon, but the versification is different. The Community of Christ also publishes a "New Authorized Version" (also called a "reader's edition"), first released in 1966, which attempts to modernize the language of the text by removing archaisms and standardizing punctuation.

Use of the Book of Mormon varies among Community of Christ membership. The church describes it as scripture and includes references to the Book of Mormon in its official lectionary. In 2010, representatives told the National Council of Churches that "the Book of Mormon is in our DNA". The book remains a symbol of the denomination's belief in continuing revelation from God. Nevertheless, its usage in North American congregations declined between the mid-twentieth and twenty-first centuries. Community of Christ theologian Anthony Chvala-Smith describes the Book of Mormon as being akin to a "subordinate standard" relative to the Bible, giving the Bible priority over the Book of Mormon, and the denomination does not emphasize the book as part of its self-conceived identity. Book of Mormon use varies in what David Howlett calls "Mormon heritage regions": North America, Western Europe, and French Polynesia. Outside these regions, where there are tens of thousands of members, congregations almost never use the Book of Mormon in their worship, and they may be entirely unfamiliar with it. Some in Community of Christ remain interested in prioritizing the Book of Mormon in religious practice and have variously responded to these developments by leaving the denomination or by striving to re-emphasize the book.

During this time, the Community of Christ moved away from emphasizing the Book of Mormon as an authentic record of a historical past. By the late-twentieth century, church president W. Grant McMurray made open the possibility the book was nonhistorical. McMurray reiterated this ambivalence in 2001, reflecting, "The proper use of the Book of Mormon as sacred scripture has been under wide discussion in the 1970s and beyond, in part because of long-standing questions about its historical authenticity and in part because of perceived theological inadequacies, including matters of race and ethnicity." When a resolution was submitted at the 2007 Community of Christ World Conference to "reaffirm the Book of Mormon as a divinely inspired record", church president Stephen M. Veazey ruled it out-of-order. He stated, "while the Church affirms the Book of Mormon as scripture, and makes it available for study and use in various languages, we do not attempt to mandate the degree of belief or use. This position is in keeping with our longstanding tradition that belief in the Book of Mormon is not to be used as a test of fellowship or membership in the church."

Greater Latter Day Saint movement 
Since the death of Joseph Smith in 1844, there have been approximately seventy different churches that have been part of the Latter Day Saint movement, fifty of which were extant as of 2012. Religious studies scholar Paul Gutjahr explains that "each of these sects developed its own special relationship with the Book of Mormon". For example James Strang, who led a denomination in the nineteenth century, reenacted Smith's production of the Book of Mormon by claiming in the 1840s and 1850s to receive and translate new scriptures engraved on metal plates, which became the Voree Plates and the Book of the Law of the Lord.

William Bickerton led another denomination, The Church of Jesus Christ of Latter Day Saints (today called The Church of Jesus Christ), which accepted the Book of Mormon as scripture alongside the Bible although it did not canonize other Latter Day Saint religious texts like the Doctrine and Covenants and Pearl of Great Price. The contemporary Church of Jesus Christ continues to consider the "Bible and Book of Mormon together" to be "the foundation of [their] faith and the building blocks of" their church.

Nahua-Mexican Latter-day Saint Margarito Bautista believed the Book of Mormon told an indigenous history of Mexico before European contact, and he identified himself as a "descendant of Father Lehi", a prophet in the Book of Mormon. Bautista believed the Book of Mormon revealed that indigenous Mexicans were a chosen remnant of biblical Israel and therefore had a sacred destiny to someday lead the church spiritually and the world politically. To promote this belief, he wrote a theological treatise synthesizing Mexican nationalism and Book of Mormon content, published in 1935. Anglo-American LDS Church leadership suppressed the book and eventually excommunicated Bautista, and he went on to found a new Mormon denomination. Officially named El Reino de Dios en su Plenitud, the denomination continues to exist in Colonial Industrial, Ozumba, Mexico as a church with several hundred members who call themselves Mormons.

Separate editions of the Book of Mormon have been published by a number of churches in the Latter Day Saint movement, along with private individuals and organizations not endorsed by any specific denomination.

Views on historical authenticity

Mainstream archaeological, historical, and scientific communities do not consider the Book of Mormon an ancient record of actual historical events. Principally, the content of the Book of Mormon does not correlate with archaeological, paleontological, and historical evidence about the past of the Americas. There is no accepted correlation between locations described in the Book of Mormon and known American archaeological sites. There is also no evidence in Mesoamerican societies of cultural influence from anything described in the Book of Mormon. Additionally, the Book of Mormon's narrative refers to the presence of animals, plants, metals, and technologies of which archaeological and scientific studies have found little or no evidence in post-Pleistocene, pre-Columbian America. Such anachronistic references include crops such as barley, wheat, and silk; livestock like sheep and horses; and metals and technology such as brass, steel, the wheel, and chariots. The Book of Mormon also includes excerpts from and demonstrates intertextuality with portions of the biblical book of Isaiah whose widely-accepted periods of creation postdate the alleged departure of Lehi's family from Jerusalem circa 600 BCE.

Until the late-twentieth century, most adherents of the Latter Day Saint movement who affirmed Book of Mormon historicity believed the people described in the Book of Mormon text were the exclusive ancestors of all indigenous peoples in the Americas. However, linguistics and genetics proved that impossible. There are no widely accepted linguistic connections between any Native American languages and Near Eastern languages, and "the diversity of Native American languages could not have developed from a single origin in the time frame" that would be necessary to validate such a view of Book of Mormon historicity. Finally, there is no DNA evidence linking any Native American group to ancestry from the ancient Near East as a belief in Book of Mormon peoples as the exclusive ancestors of indigenous Americans would require. Instead, geneticists find that indigenous Americans' ancestry traces back to Asia.

Despite this, most adherents of the Latter Day Saint movement consider the Book of Mormon to generally be historically authentic. Within the Latter Day Saint movement there are several individuals and apologetic organizations, most of whom are or which are  lay Latter-day Saints, that seek to answer challenges to or advocate for Book of Mormon historicity. For example, in response to linguistics and genetics rendering long-popular hemispheric models of Book of Mormon geography impossible, many apologists posit Book of Mormon peoples could have dwelled in a limited geographical region while indigenous peoples of other descents occupied the rest of the Americas. To account for anachronisms, apologists often suggest Smith's translation assigned familiar terms to unfamiliar ideas. In the context of a miraculously translated Book of Mormon, anachronistic intertextuality may also have miraculous explanations.

Advocating for their interpretation of the book's historicity, some apologists strive to identify parallels between the Book of Mormon and biblical antiquity, such as the presence of several complex chiasmi resembling a literary form used in ancient Hebrew poetry and in the Old Testament. Others attempt to identify parallels between Mesoamerican archaeological sites and locations described in the Book of Mormon, such as John L. Sorenson, according to whom the Santa Rosa archaeological site resembles the city of Zarahemla in the Book of Mormon. When mainstream, non-Mormon scholars examine alleged parallels between the Book of Mormon and the ancient world, however, scholars typically deem them "chance based upon only superficial similarities" or "parallelomania", the result of having predetermined ideas about the subject.

Despite the popularity and influence among Latter-day Saints of literature propounding Book of Mormon historicity, not all Mormons who affirm Book of Mormon historicity are universally persuaded by apologetic work, and some claim historicity more modestly, such as Richard Bushman's statement that "I read the Book of Mormon as informed Christians read the Bible. As I read, I know the arguments against the book's historicity, but I can't help feeling that the words are true and the events happened. I believe it in the face of many questions."

Some denominations and adherents of the Latter Day Saint movement consider the Book of Mormon a work of inspired fiction akin to pseudepigrapha or biblical midrash that constitutes scripture by revealing true doctrine about God, similar to a common interpretation of the biblical Book of Job. Many in Community of Christ hold this view, and the leadership takes no official position on Book of Mormon historicity; among lay members, views vary. Some Latter-day Saints consider the Book of Mormon fictional, although this view is marginal in the community at large.

Influenced by continental philosophy, a handful of academics argue for understanding the Book of Mormon not as historical or unhistorical (either factual or fictional) but as nonhistorical (existing outside history). In this view, both skeptical and affirmative approaches to Book of Mormon historicity make the same Enlightenment-derived assumptions about scriptures being representations of external reality, whereas a premodern understanding would accept scripture as capable of divinely ordering, rather than simply depicting, reality.

Historical context

American Indian origins 

Contact with the indigenous peoples of the Americas prompted intellectual and theological controversy among many Europeans and European Americans who wondered how biblical narratives of world history could account for hitherto unrecognized indigenous societies. From the seventeenth century through the early-nineteenth, numerous European and U. S. American writers proposed that ancient Jews, perhaps through the Lost Ten Tribes, were the ancestors of Native Americans. One of the first books to suggest that Native Americans descended from Jews was written by Jewish-Dutch rabbi and scholar Manasseh ben Israel in 1650. Such curiosity and speculation about indigenous origins persisted in the United States into the antebellum period when the Book of Mormon was published, as archaeologist Stephen Williams explains that "relating the American Indians to the Lost Tribes of Israel was supported by many at" the time of the book's production and publication. Although the Book of Mormon did not explicitly identify Native Americans as descendants of the diasporic Israelites in its narrative, nineteenth-century readers consistently drew that conclusion and considered the book theological support for believing American Indians were of Israelite descent.

Additionally, European settlers viewed the impressive earthworks left behind by the Mound Builder cultures and had some difficulty believing that the Native Americans, whose numbers had been greatly reduced over the previous centuries, could have produced them. A common theory was that a more "civilized" and "advanced" people had built them, but were overrun and destroyed by a more savage, numerous group. Some Book of Mormon content resembles this "mound-builder" genre pervasive in the nineteenth century. Historian Curtis Dahl wrote, "Undoubtedly the most famous and certainly the most influential of all Mound-Builder literature is the Book of Mormon (1830). Whether one wishes to accept it as divinely inspired or the work of Joseph Smith, it fits exactly into the tradition." However, the Book of Mormon does not comfortably fit the genre, since, as historian Richard Bushman explains, "When other writers delved into Indian origins, they were explicit about recognizable Indian practices", such as Abner Cole, who dressed characters in moccasins in his parody of the book. Meanwhile, the "Book of Mormon deposited its people on some unknown shore—not even definitely identified as America—and had them live out their history in a remote place in a distant time, using names that had no connections to modern Indians" and without including stereotypical Indian terms, practices, or tropes, suggesting disinterest in making connections to mound-builder tropes.

Critique of the United States 
The Book of Mormon can be read as a critique of the United States during Smith's lifetime. Historian of religion Nathan O. Hatch called the Book of Mormon "a document of profound social protest", and Bushman "found the book thundering no to the state of the world in Joseph Smith's time." In the Jacksonian era of antebellum America, class inequality was a major concern as fiscal downturns and the economy's transition from guild-based artisanship to private business sharpened socioeconomic disparity. Poll taxes in New York limited access to the vote, and the culture of civil discourse and mores surrounding liberty allowed social elites to ignore and delegitimize populist participation in public discourse. Ethnic injustice was also prominent, as Americans typically stereotyped American Indians as ferocious, lazy, and uncivilized. Meanwhile, some Americans thought antebellum disestablishment and denominational proliferation undermined religious authority through ubiquity, producing sectarian confusion that only obfuscated the path to spiritual security.

Against the backdrop of these trends, the Book of Mormon "condemned social inequalities, moral abominations, rejection of revelations and miracles, disrespect for Israel (including the Jews), subjection of the Indians, and the abuse of the continent by interloping European migrants". The book's narratives critique bourgeois public discourse where rules of civil democracy silence the demands of common people, and it advocates for the poor, condemning acquisitiveness as antithetical to righteousness. Within the narrative, Lamanites, whom readers generally identified with American Indians, at times were overwhelmingly righteous, even producing a prophet who preached to backsliding Nephites, and the book declared natives to be the rightful inheritors to and leaders of the American continent. According to the book, implicitly-European Gentiles had an obligation to serve the native people and join their remnant of covenant Israel or else face a violent downfall like the Nephites of the text. In the context of the nineteenth-century United States, the Book of Mormon rejects American denominational pluralism, Enlightenment hegemony, individualistic capitalism, and American nationalism, calling instead for ecclesiastical unity, miraculous religion, communitarian economics, and universal society under God's authority.

Manuscripts

Joseph Smith dictated the Book of Mormon to several scribes over a period of 13 months, resulting in three manuscripts. Upon examination of pertinent historical records, the book appears to have been dictated over the course of 57 to 63 days within the 13 month period.

The 116 lost pages contained the first portion of the Book of Lehi; it was lost after Smith loaned the original, uncopied manuscript to Martin Harris.

The first completed manuscript, called the original manuscript, was completed using a variety of scribes. Portions of the original manuscript were also used for typesetting. In October 1841, the entire original manuscript was placed into the cornerstone of the Nauvoo House, and sealed up until nearly forty years later when the cornerstone was reopened. It was then discovered that much of the original manuscript had been destroyed by water seepage and mold. Surviving manuscript pages were handed out to various families and individuals in the 1880s.

Only 28 percent of the original manuscript now survives, including a remarkable find of fragments from 58 pages in 1991. The majority of what remains of the original manuscript is now kept in the LDS Church's archives.

The second completed manuscript, called the printer's manuscript, was a copy of the original manuscript produced by Oliver Cowdery and two other scribes. It is at this point that initial copyediting of the Book of Mormon was completed. Observations of the original manuscript show little evidence of corrections to the text. Shortly before his death in 1850, Cowdery gave the printer's manuscript to David Whitmer, another of the Three Witnesses. In 1903, the manuscript was bought from Whitmer's grandson by the Reorganized Church of Jesus Christ of Latter Day Saints, now known as the Community of Christ. On September 20, 2017, the LDS Church purchased the manuscript from the Community of Christ at a reported price of $35 million. The printer's manuscript is now the earliest surviving complete copy of the Book of Mormon. The manuscript was imaged in 1923 and was recently made available for viewing online.

Critical comparisons between surviving portions of the manuscripts show an average of two to three changes per page from the original manuscript to the printer's manuscript, with most changes being corrections of scribal errors such as misspellings or the correction, or standardization, of grammar inconsequential to the meaning of the text. The printer's manuscript was further edited, adding paragraphing and punctuation to the first third of the text.

The printer's manuscript was not used fully in the typesetting of the 1830 version of Book of Mormon; portions of the original manuscript were also used for typesetting. The original manuscript was used by Smith to further correct errors printed in the 1830 and 1837 versions of the Book of Mormon for the 1840 printing of the book.

Ownership history: Book of Mormon printer's manuscript
In the late-19th century the extant portion of the printer's manuscript remained with the family of David Whitmer, who had been a principal founder of the Latter Day Saints and who, by the 1870s, led the Church of Christ (Whitmerite). During the 1870s, according to the Chicago Tribune, the LDS Church unsuccessfully attempted to buy it from Whitmer for a record price. Church president Joseph F. Smith refuted this assertion in a 1901 letter, believing such a manuscript "possesses no value whatever." In 1895, Whitmer's grandson George Schweich inherited the manuscript. By 1903, Schweich had mortgaged the manuscript for $1,800 and, needing to raise at least that sum, sold a collection including 72-percent of the book of the original printer's manuscript (John Whitmer's manuscript history, parts of Joseph Smith's translation of the Bible, manuscript copies of several revelations, and a piece of paper containing copied Book of Mormon characters) to the RLDS Church (now the Community of Christ) for $2,450, with $2,300 of this amount for the printer's manuscript. The LDS Church had not sought to purchase the manuscript.

Editions

Chapter and verse notation systems 
The original 1830 publication had unnumbered paragraphs (and no verses) which were divided into relatively long chapters. Just as the Bible's present chapter and verse notation system is a later addition of Bible publishers to books that were originally solid blocks of undivided text, the chapter and verse markers within the books of the Book of Mormon are conventions, not part of the original text.

The format of the Book of Mormon stayed the same, with citations noted by book and page number, (Book of Alma, page 262) or just the page number (page 262). As more editions were made, the references were noted by the edition. In 1852, Franklin D. Richards integrated numbered paragraphs for easier reference.

In 1876, Orson Pratt revised the Book of Mormon, and while doing so, created smaller chapters comparable in length to the Bible, and added true Versification. In 1908, the RLDS Church revised their edition. While doing so, they added versification similar in breaks to the 1876 edition, but opted to use the original longer chapters.

Most modern editions use one of the two, based on their heritage. The editions published by the Community of Christ (1908/AV & 1966/RAV), the RCE, and the Temple Lot edition use the 1908 Authorized Version Versing. The LDS Church uses the 1876 Orson Pratt versing.

Church editions

Other editions

Historic editions
The following editions no longer in publication marked major developments in the text or reader's helps printed in the Book of Mormon.

Textual criticism 

Although some earlier unpublished studies had been prepared, not until the early 1970s was true textual criticism applied to the Book of Mormon. At that time BYU Professor Ellis Rasmussen and his associates were asked by The Church of Jesus Christ of Latter-day Saints (LDS Church) to begin preparation for a new edition of its scriptures. One aspect of that effort entailed digitizing the text and preparing appropriate footnotes; another aspect required establishing the most dependable text. To that latter end, Stanley R. Larson (a Rasmussen graduate student) set about applying modern text critical standards to the manuscripts and early editions of the Book of Mormon as his thesis project—which he completed in 1974. Larson carefully examined the original manuscript (the one dictated by Joseph Smith to his scribes) and the printer's manuscript (the copy Oliver Cowdery prepared for the printer in 1829–1830), and compared them with the first, second, and third editions of the Book of Mormon; this was done to determine what sort of changes had occurred over time and to make judgments as to which readings were the most original. Larson proceeded to publish a set of well-argued articles on the phenomena which he had discovered. Many of his observations were included as improvements in the church's 1981 edition of the Book of Mormon.

By 1979, with the establishment of the Foundation for Ancient Research and Mormon Studies (FARMS) as a California non-profit research institution, an effort led by Robert F. Smith began to take full account of Larson's work and to publish a critical text of the Book of Mormon. Thus was born the FARMS Critical Text Project which published the first volume of the three-volume Book of Mormon Critical Text in 1984. The third volume of that first edition was published in 1987, but was already being superseded by a second, revised edition of the entire work, greatly aided through the advice and assistance of a team that included Yale doctoral candidate Grant Hardy, Dr. Gordon C. Thomasson, Professor John W. Welch (the head of FARMS), and Professor Royal Skousen. However, these were merely preliminary steps to a far more exacting and all-encompassing project.

In 1988, with that preliminary phase of the project completed, Skousen took over as editor and head of the FARMS Critical Text of the Book of Mormon Project and proceeded to gather still scattered fragments of the original manuscript of the Book of Mormon and to have advanced photographic techniques applied to obtain fine readings from otherwise unreadable pages and fragments. He also closely examined the printer's manuscript (then owned by RLDS Church) for differences in types of ink or pencil, in order to determine when and by whom they were made. He also collated the various editions of the Book of Mormon down to the present to see what sorts of changes have been made through time.

Skousen and the Critical Text Project have published complete transcripts of the Original and Printer's Manuscripts (volumes I and II), parts of a history of the text (volume III), and a six-part analysis of textual variants (volume IV). The remainder of the eight-part history of the text and a complete electronic collation of editions and manuscripts (volumes 5 of the Project) remain forthcoming. In 2009, Yale University published an edition of the Book of Mormon which incorporates all aspects of Skousen's research.

Differences between the original and printer's manuscript, the 1830 printed version, and modern versions of the Book of Mormon have led some critics to claim that evidence has been systematically removed that could have proven that Smith fabricated the Book of Mormon, or are attempts to hide embarrassing aspects of the church's past. Latter-day Saint scholars view the changes as superficial, done to clarify the meaning of the text.

Non-English translations 

The Latter-day Saints version of the Book of Mormon has been translated into 83 languages and selections have been translated into an additional 25 languages. In 2001, the LDS Church reported that all or part of the Book of Mormon was available in the native language of 99 percent of Latter-day Saints and 87 percent of the world's total population.

Translations into languages without a tradition of writing (e.g., Kaqchikel, Tzotzil) have been published as audio recordings and as transliterations with Latin characters. Translations into American Sign Language are available as video recordings.

Typically, translators are Latter-day Saints who are employed by the church and translate the text from the original English. Each manuscript is reviewed several times before it is approved and published.

In 1998, the church stopped translating selections from the Book of Mormon and announced that instead each new translation it approves will be a full edition.

Representations in media

Events of the Book of Mormon are the focus of several films produced by the LDS Church, including The Life of Nephi (1915), How Rare a Possession (1987) and The Testaments of One Fold and One Shepherd (2000). Depictions of Book of Mormon narratives in films not officially commissioned by the church (sometimes colloquially known as Mormon cinema) include The Book of Mormon Movie, Vol. 1: The Journey (2003) and Passage to Zarahemla (2007).

In "one of the most complex uses of Mormonism in cinema," Alfred Hitchcock's film Family Plot portrays a funeral service in which a priest (apparently non-Mormon, by his appearance) reads Second Nephi 9:20–27, a passage describing Jesus Christ having victory over death.

In 2011, a long-running religious satire musical titled The Book of Mormon, written by South Park creators Trey Parker and Matt Stone in collaboration with Robert Lopez, premiered on Broadway, winning nine Tony Awards, including Best Musical. Its London production won the Olivier Award for best musical. Although it is titled The Book of Mormon, the musical does not depict Book of Mormon content. Its plot tells an original story about Latter-day Saint missionaries in the twenty-first century.

In 2019, the church began producing a series of live-action adaptations of various stories within the Book of Mormon, titled Book of Mormon Videos, which it distributed on its website and YouTube channel.

Distribution 
The LDS Church distributes free copies of the Book of Mormon, and it reported in 2011 that 150 million copies of the book have been printed since its initial publication.

The initial printing of the Book of Mormon in 1830 produced 5000 copies. The 50 millionth copy was printed in 1990, with the 100 millionth following in 2000 and reaching 150 million in 2011.

In October 2020, the church announced it had printed over 192 million copies of the Book of Mormon.

See also

 Journal of Book of Mormon Studies
 List of Gospels
 Studies of the Book of Mormon

References

Citations

General and cited sources

Further reading 

 
 
 
 
 
 
 
 
 
 
 
  One volume in six parts. 
  One volume in six parts. Republished online by the Interpreter Foundation in 2014.

External links

 Book of Mormon (the current official edition of The Church of Jesus Christ of Latter-day Saints)
 Project Gutenberg has the full text of the Book of Mormon in various formats (LDS chapters and numbering)
 RLDS 1908 Book of Mormon (RLDS chapters and numbering)
 The Book of Mormon; An Account Written By the Hand of Mormon Upon Plates Taken From the Plates of Nephi. From the Collections at the Library of Congress
Photographs and transcription of the printer's manuscript of the Book of Mormon by the Joseph Smith Papers
Photocopies and transcription of the 1830 edition of the Book of Mormon by the Joseph Smith Papers
Photographs and transcription of the 1840 of the Book of Mormon by the Joseph Smith Papers
 

 
1830 books
1830 in Christianity
19th-century Christian texts
Standard works
Works by Joseph Smith
Works in the style of the King James Version